Chesterman is a surname. Notable people with the surname include:

Alex Chesterman (born 1970), British internet entrepreneur
Ché Chesterman
Ron Chesterman (1939–2007), English musician and archivist